Getty may refer to:

The Getty family and its businesses
 Getty family
 George Getty (1855–1930), American lawyer and father of J. Paul Getty
 J. Paul Getty (1892–1976), wealthy American industrialist and founder of Getty Oil
 Talitha Getty (born Talitha Dina Pol, 1940–1971), Paul Getty, II's second wife
 Gordon Getty (born 1933), son of J. Paul Getty
 Ann Getty (1941–2020), wife of Gordon Getty
 Paul Getty (1932–2003), son of J. Paul Getty, born Eugene Paul Getty and later also known as John Paul Getty II
 John Paul Getty III (1956–2011), son of Paul Getty
 Balthazar Getty (born 1975), son of John Paul Getty III, and American actor
 Mark Getty, son of Paul Getty, and founder of Getty Images
 Domitilla Getty, ex-wife of Mark Getty
 Ariadne Getty, daughter of Paul Getty, philanthropist
 August Getty (born 1994), fashion designer
 Nats Getty (born 1992), model and activist
 Gigi Lazzarato Getty (born 1992), wife of Nats Getty
 Pia Getty (born Pia Miller), ex-wife of Christopher Ronald Getty
 Isabel Getty (born 1993), daughter of Pia and Christopher Getty
 Sabine Getty (born Sabine Ghanem), wife of Joseph Getty
 Victoria Getty (born Victoria Holdsworth; 1944), wife of Sir Paul Getty

Residences 
 Getty House

Businesses
Getty Oil, founded by George Getty
Getty Images, a stock photography company founded by Mark Getty

The J. Paul Getty Trust, its programs, and its locations
 J. Paul Getty Trust, whose programs include the Museum, Research Institute, Conservation Institute, and Foundation
 Getty Center, located in Los Angeles, California, home of the J. Paul Getty Trust, Getty Conservation Institute, Getty Foundation, Getty Research Institute, and part of the J. Paul Getty Museum
 Getty Conservation Institute, working internationally to advance conservation practice in cultural heritage
 Getty Foundation, a grant-awarding body
 Getty Leadership Institute at Claremont Graduate University, a grantee of the Getty Foundation that provides executive education for museum leaders
 Getty Research Institute, "dedicated to furthering knowledge and advancing understanding of the visual arts"
 Art & Architecture Thesaurus, produced by the Getty Research Institute
 Getty Thesaurus of Geographic Names, a resource of names and information about cities, countries, and other locations and a product of the J. Paul Getty Trust
 J. Paul Getty Museum, with locations at the Getty Center and Getty Villa
 Getty Villa, located near Malibu, California, part of the J. Paul Getty Museum, designed as a recreation of the Villa of the Papyri

Other people
 Don Getty (1933–2016), Canadian politician
 Edmund Getty (1799–1857), Irish antiquarian and naturalist
 Estelle Getty (1923–2008), American actress
 George W. Getty (1819–1901), officer in the United States Army
 J. Arch Getty (born 1950), American historian
 Keith Getty (born 1974), Irish musician
 Kristyn Getty (born 1980), Irish musician
 Keith & Kristyn Getty, Irish contemporary worship music duo

Other
 getty (Unix), a program that handles the login process when someone logs onto a computer running Unix
 The version of the 1409 fighting manual Fior di Battaglia, is known as the "Getty"

See also
Gettys

Anglicised Irish-language surnames